The Flieger Trophy is a Group 3 flat horse race in Germany open to thoroughbreds aged three years or older. It is run at Hamburg-Horn over a distance of 1,200 metres (about 6 furlongs), and it is scheduled to take place each year in June or July.

History
The event was established in 1966, and the inaugural running was titled the Campari-Preis. It was initially contested over 1,200 metres, and was extended to 1,400 metres in 1974. For a period it was known as the Preis der Dresdner Bank.

The race was given Group 3 status in 1985, and it reverted to 1,200 metres in 1989. Its title has often changed, and for several years it was called the Holsten-Trophy. It became known as the Flieger Trophy in 2010.

Records
Most successful horse (2 wins):
 Dream Talk – 1991, 1992
 Areion – 1998, 2000
 Gorse – 1999, 2001
 Lucky Strike – 2004, 2005
 Govinda – 2010, 2012

Leading jockey (4 wins):
 Peter Remmert – Gegenwind (1968), Tamburlaine (1972), Weltstar (1979), Zünftiger (1984)

Leading trainer (4 wins):
 Andreas Wöhler – Areion (1998, 2000), Govinda (2010, 2012)

Winners

See also
 List of German flat horse races

References
 Racing Post:
2018 2019
 galopp-sieger.de – Hamburg Trophy.
 horseracingintfed.com – International Federation of Horseracing Authorities – Race Detail (2012).
 pedigreequery.com – Holsten Trophy – Hamburg.

Open sprint category horse races
Horse races in Germany
Recurring sporting events established in 1966
Sport in Hamburg